The 1954 Arizona gubernatorial election took place on November 2, 1954. Incumbent Governor John Howard Pyle, the first Republican elected to the office in two decades, ran for reelection for a third term.

Former U.S. Senator Ernest McFarland defeated Governor John Howard Pyle by a narrow margin. McFarland had lost his bid for reelection to the United States Senate to Barry Goldwater in 1952, with McFarland subsequently deciding to run for the office of governor.

Republican primary

Candidates
 John Howard Pyle, incumbent Governor

Democratic primary
The Democratic primary took place on September 7, 1954. Due to the Republican Party tidal wave led by Dwight D. Eisenhower in 1952, incumbent U.S. Senator Ernest McFarland lost his bid for reelection to the United States Senate to Barry Goldwater. He subsequently decided to run for the office of Governor of Arizona and challenge incumbent Republican Governor John Howard Pyle, the first Republican to hold the office for more than two decades. McFarland was challenged in the primary by State Senator William F. Kimball, but McFarland easily won.

Candidates
 Ernest McFarland, former U.S. Senator
 William F. Kimball, State Senator

Results

General election

Results

References

1954
1954 United States gubernatorial elections
Gubernatorial
November 1954 events in the United States